Cho Hyung-Jae (Hangul : 조형재, born January 8, 1985) is a South Korean football player who has played for Pocheon Citizen F.C. in the Korean Challengers League.

He has played for Jeju United FC in the K-League.

References

1985 births
Living people
Association football forwards
South Korean footballers
Jeju United FC players
K League 1 players
Korea National League players
Pocheon Citizen FC players